Raphael Wressnig (born October 14, 1979 in Graz, Austria) is a jazz, blues, funk organist, songwriter and producer. He recorded 17 albums of his own, as well as appearing on some 35 others as a guest. In 2013 and 2015 he received a nomination for "best organ player of the year" by Down Beat magazine.

References

1979 births
Living people
Austrian male musicians
Austrian songwriters
Male songwriters
Musicians from Graz